Basye may refer to:

 Basye, Virginia, United States, a census-designated place
 Chuck Basye (born 1958), American politician
 John Walter Basye (1770–1845), founder of the city of Louisiana, Missouri, United States

See also
 Basey (disambiguation)
 Basie (disambiguation)